In Turkey, pink certificate is the colloquial name for a military discharge certificate given to those who are discharged or considered exempt from military service due to their sexual orientation. The Turkish Armed Forces Health Regulation, under Article 17 of "Mental Health and Diseases," explains that the case of "advanced sexual disorders," which are "explicitly apparent in the person's whole life," could cause "objectionable situations in the military environment"  To receive such a discharge, individuals must "prove" their homosexuality, under the examination of military doctors and psychologists.

Background

Homosexuality in Turkey 

The first piece of LGBTQ legislation was passed during the Ottoman Caliphate, when homosexuality, köçek (young dancer slaves) and sodomy were decriminalized in 1858, as part of wider reforms during the Tanzimat. The first Turkish LGBTQ organizations were founded in the early 1990s, Lambdaistanbul, the first of such organizations, was founded in 1993 as a cultural space for the LGBT community, becoming an official organization in 2006. Historically, although homosexuality has not enjoyed a public platform, participation in pride marches, and public acceptance and visibility have risen slowly over the past few years. In spring 2010, Turkey's Minister of State Responsible for Women and Family Affairs, Selma Aliye Kavaf, attracted much media attention when she made a controversial statement during an interview with the daily Hürriyet newspaper: “I believe that homosexuality is a biological disorder, a disease. It is something that needs to get treated.”  This sparked national as well as international interest in the state of LGBT rights and individuals in Turkey for a brief time as a reaction: LGBT activists organized a march on Istiklal Avenue to call for an apology, homosexuality became a topic of discussion on a public level, and international media outlets criticized the statement, as well as Turkey's stance on homosexuality.

In 2011, Turkey witnessed the biggest pride march to date in southeast Europe, with participation reaching over 10,000, and with support from parties such as CHP and BDP. In 2013, the Istanbul pride march consisted of over 100,000 people, due in large part to the Gezi Park protests taking place at the same time.

Conscription 
The Conscription Law that dictates conscription as mandatory was introduced in 1919 at the start of the Turkish War of Independence and has stayed in force since then. Compulsory military service in Turkey applies to all male citizens from twenty to forty years of age, with no legal alternative. There has been significant rise in critical discussions about the topic of mandatory conscription, however most government as well as military officials still oppose the idea of changing Turkey's conscription system. Those who oppose performing military service face three options: they can decide to become a deserter by either leaving the country, or trying to find other ways to escape the grip of the state; they can declare to be a conscientious objector, a decision which is followed by legal persecution in the form of a prison sentence; or they can try to find a way to get (legally) exempted within the framework of health regulations. The Turkish military considers homosexuality a "psychosexual disorder", and thereby worthy of discharge.

Upon completion of their military service, Turks receive a certificate of completion; a certificate of discharge (colloquially referred to as the "pink certificate" or "rotten certificate") if they reveal their homosexual identity any time during the service, in accordance with the health regulation frameworks, or engage in homosexual acts.

Conditions for acquiring the "Pink Certificate"

Military Health Regulations 
The Military Health Regulation for the Turkish Armed Forces looks to the 1968 American Psychiatrists Association's definition of homosexuality as a disease in the Diagnostic and Statistical Manual released that year. As such, homosexuals who are discharged or exempt from military service receive the same report as those who have mental or physical disabilities, and are considered to have a psychosexual disorder. In order to receive this report, individuals have to "prove their homosexuality," undergoing what the Human Rights Watch calls "humiliating and degrading" examinations and tests.

In October 2009 the report of the EU Commission on Enlargement stated that "The Turkish armed forces have a health regulation which defines homosexuality as a ‘psychosexual’ illness and identifies homosexuals as unfit for military service. Conscripts who declare their homosexuality have to provide photographic proof (a photograph of the person on the receiving end of anal intercourse). A small number have had to undergo humiliating medical examinations." These steps are taken, according to the military, to make sure that the system is not being exploited by deserters in order to skip mandatory military service, which has been a historical problem.

Acquiring the "Pink Certificate" 
Individual experience of the process has varied depending on the assigned military ward, the examining experts, and the individual. The system has been undergoing change for the past few years: Lambdaistanbul's lawyer Fırat Söyle stated in 2012 that the rectal examinations, and the photographic evidence of anal intercourse have been dismissed as requirements when they gained worldwide and national media attention. The current and most common method is to conduct a series of psychological evaluations, consisting of personality tests and interviews with the draftee as well as with the draftee's family. The individual may even be confined to stay in the psychiatry ward for a short period of time, in a dormitory nicknamed "pink dorms," if he is not considered to be effeminate enough, and a chance of recovery is recognized. For those who work for the military, as well as those in military school, homosexuality leads to the immediate termination of their jobs.

Three phases: Family interview, personal interview and committee delegation 
To be discharged from the military with a "pink certificate," typically, one must appeal to the hospital, or in the case of a draftee, ask to be consigned to the hospital. To undergo the examinations as a draftee, one must procure a written approval from the family doctor, and then go back to the military ward in order to receive a date for an appointment.

The first phase will be the family interview, for which one will need a family member to come along. The questions will be asked to the family member,  and can be anything along the lines of "Does he wear colorful clothing? Does he wear tight clothing? Does he wear accessories? Does he put on makeup? Does he behave feminine?" etc. In order to get to the second phase, the personal interview, the doctor must be sufficiently convinced by the answers.

The second phase involves a series of tests and personal interviews. This typically includes the 600-question Minnesota multiphasic personality inventory, and the House-Tree-Person test, after which a personal interview is conducted. The questions asked here have a wide range, from "Are you a top or a bottom?" to "Do you receive psychological support?"

The third phase involves an interview with a committee of doctors that will make the final decision, after asking more personal questions.

The process of acquiring the discharge papers might take anywhere from a week to a few months, and it is not guaranteed that they will be granted – the process can stop at any point in the way since the evaluations are based on entirely subjective perceptions and frameworks. The army discharges homosexuals only insofar as they are found to be a potential disruptive force in the military, and to establish a connection between sexual identity and disruptive behavior examiners look to the degree of "feminine" or "promiscuous" behavior.

Criticisms 
Excluding homosexuals from the military has been widely regarded as a controversial topic, its negative effects not only confined to the context of military service. The process by which homosexuals are excluded from the military has received criticism from international and national actors for a multitude of reasons and has been called a "Human Rights Crisis" by the Human Rights Watch. The process correlates sexual orientation with arbitrary factors, such as "feminine" qualities or "promiscuity," and propagates false narratives, homophobia and violence, inside and outside of the military. The involvement of family members means homosexuals are forced to come out, the pressure of which might deter the option to acquire the pink certificate, and continue military service hiding their identity. This leads increased homophobia, blackmail and violence towards homosexuals or effeminate men, since homosexuals in the army have no place to report such violent discrimination, and no protection from it. The insistence on family is a tactic that exploits feelings of shame, forcing the family to be interrogated about their child's sexual identity, often accompanied by inappropriate questions.

Talking about homosexuality in the military is also a taboo, and challenging the status quo can be met with legal challenges, as it is considered illegal to insult the Turkish army. Furthermore, mandatory military service holds a very honorable place in Turkish culture, and not participating in this rite of passage carries a huge social stigma. The stigma stays with the individual for a lifetime, severely damaging the possibility of being hired, as employers typically request proof that the employee has done their military service. In addition, employers can discern the sexuality of potential employees from their discharge papers (differentiating between those discharged for physical or mental disabilities, and for homosexuality) further reducing chances of employment, and resulting in the employee being fired if it is ever found out.

See also 
LGBT history in Turkey
LGBT rights in Turkey
Homosexuality test (disambiguation)
Sexual orientation and military service

References

LGBT culture in Turkey
Military slang and jargon
Turkish Land Forces
LGBT people and military service
tr:Pembe Tezkere